The 2010 Lokomotiv season was the 18th successive season that Lokomotiv played in the Russian Premier League, the highest tier of association football in Russia. They finished the season in 5th place, qualifying for the 2011–12 UEFA Europa League, were knocked out of the Russian Cup by Gornyak Uchaly at the Round of 32 stage, and knocked out of the 2010–11 UEFA Europa League by Lausanne-Sport on penalties at the playoff stage.

Squad

 (vice-captain)

Players on loan

Transfers

Winter

In:

Out:

Summer

In:

Out:

Competitions

Russian Premier League

Matches

League table

Russian Cup

Europa League

Play-off Round

Squad statistics

Appearances and goals

|-
|colspan="14"|Players away from the club on loan:

|-
|colspan="14"|Players who appeared for Lokomotiv Moscow no longer at the club:

|}

Goal Scorers

Disciplinary record

References

2010
LokomotivMoscow